"Drummer Boy" is the first single released from the debut album of Costa Rican singer-songwriter Debi Nova, Luna Nueva (2010).

Charts

References

2010 singles
2010 songs
Songs written by Leah Haywood
Songs written by Daniel James (record producer)